Brynmenyn railway station served the village of Brynmenyn, in the historic county of Glamorgan, Wales, from 1873 to 1958 on the Garw Valley Railway.

History 
The station was opened as Brynmenin on 12 May 1873 by the Llynvi and Ogmore Railway. Its name was changed to Brynmenyn in 1886, although the old spelling remained in the handbook of stations until 1890. The station closed on 5 May 1958.

References

External links 

Disused railway stations in Bridgend County Borough
Former Great Western Railway stations
Railway stations in Great Britain opened in 1873
Railway stations in Great Britain closed in 1958
1873 establishments in Wales
1958 disestablishments in Wales